Mason and Dixon is an unincorporated community in Franklin County, in the U.S. state of Pennsylvania.

History
The community lies at the Maryland—Pennsylvania state line, which once marked the Mason–Dixon line. A variant name was "Mason-Dixon". A post office called Mason And Dixon was established in 1868, and remained in operation until 1955.

References

Unincorporated communities in Franklin County, Pennsylvania
Unincorporated communities in Pennsylvania
Mason–Dixon line